Elmer Ellsworth Johnson (June 12, 1884 – October 31, 1966) was a catcher in Major League Baseball. Nicknamed "Hickory", he played for the New York Giants in 1914.

References

External links

1884 births
1966 deaths
Major League Baseball catchers
New York Giants (NL) players
Baseball players from Indiana
People from Clinton County, Indiana
Springfield Senators players
Omaha Rourkes players
St. Paul Saints (AA) players
Lincoln Tigers players
San Antonio Bears players
Taylorville Tailors players